"Mnemonics" is a short story by Kurt Vonnegut, first published on 28 April 1951 in Collier's, and later in Bagombo Snuff Box in 1999.

"Mnemonics" was one of the first short stories Vonnegut wrote (and one of the first of his which was published), and is only seven pages long. The story centers around Alfred Moorehead, an office worker who undergoes treatment to improve his memory. Everything goes according to plan and his productivity improves, but he is still unable to share his feelings for his secretary. As his work piles up, he remembers everything, except her.

1951 short stories
Short stories by Kurt Vonnegut